Darryl Stephens (born 10 January 1944) is a former  Australian rules footballer who played with Geelong in the Victorian Football League (VFL).  In AFL, per 1965 he ranked  7,252nd player to appear, 6,670th amongst most games played, 7,772nd on goals kicked

As in Geelong, pre 1965, he was 656th player to appear with 574th most games played and 673rd most goals kicked

Notes

External links 

Living people
1944 births
Australian rules footballers from Victoria (Australia)
Geelong Football Club players